Ikechukwu Francis Okoronkwo (born 27 May 1970) is a Nigerian visual artist, painter, sculptor and author.

Early life and education 
Ikechukwu was born on 27 May 1970 into the family of Francis Okoronkwo in Oguta, Nigeria. He graduated with B.A. Creative arts from the University of Port-Harcourt in 1995 and in 2001, he completed his M.A. Fine Art from University of Nigeria, Nsukka.

Exhibitions 
Ikechukwu Francis Okoronkwo has exhibited in various local and international solo and group exhibitions, some of which include: Created For A Purpose (With David Enyi) B.V.L, Port-Harcourt 1997, Terrain Of The Mind Ondo. Ondo State 1996,Views (With Jumah Ibeagbazi) Alliance Francaise, Kaduna State 2004, A Village Square. Omega Gallery, Sheraton Hotels and Towers Abuja 2005, DUTA, Biennale des Arts Visuels, Bonapriso Center For the Arts. Douala, Cameroon 2007, A Glimpse into Nigerian Art. Cheikh Anta DIOP University, Dakar, Senegal 2006.

Writings 
Ikechukwu Francis Okoronkwo first published book is Petals and Thorns, a collection of poems to honour the people he referred to as close to his heart and who have helped him while growing up.

See also 

 Ade Adekola
 Nengi Omuku
 Lemi Ghariokwu

References 

1970 births
Living people
Nigerian artists
Nigerian writers
Nigerian painters
University of Nigeria alumni